Mike McKenzie (born Michael McTernan) is a singer, songwriter and multi-instrumentalist from Edinburgh, Scotland.

In 2019 McKenzie won the inaugural BBC Radio Scotland Singer/Songwriter of the Year Award. The winner was determined by judges Fran Healy (Travis), Horse McDonald, Geoff Ellis (DF Concerts), Karine Polwart and Dee Bahl.

Outside of his solo work, McKenzie is the lead vocalist for collaborative project PJ Moore & Co. alongside the Blue Nile's PJ Moore and composer Malcolm Lindsay. They released their debut album When a Good Day Comes in September 2022.

He has performed at the Queen's Hall and Rosslyn Chapel in Edinburgh, the Albert Halls, Stirling, and in Glasgow at the Hug & Pint, the TRNSMT Festival, and the Barrowland Ballroom.

References

External links
 
 Spotify
 Bandcamp

Scottish singer-songwriters
Living people
Year of birth missing (living people)